Chuuk State Department of Education is an agency of Chuuk State, Federated States of Micronesia. It is headquartered in Nantaku, Weno, Chuuk Island.

Schools
High schools:
 Chuuk High School
 Faichuk High School
 Moch High School
 Mortlock High School
 Southern Namoneas High School (SNHS)
 Weno High School

Junior high schools:
 Halls Junior High School
 Lukeisel Junior High School
 Nomwenemu Junior High School
 Nomusofo Junior High School
 Pattiw Junior High School
 Polle, Paata, Onei Junior High School

Elementary schools:
 Amwachang Elementary School
 Chukuram Elementary School
 Epin/Nukaf Elementary School
 Eot Elementary School
 Ettal Elementary School
 Fananu Elementary School
 Fanapanges Elementary School
 Faro/Winifei Elementary School
 Fason Elementary School
 Fonoton Elementary School
 Foup Elementary School
 Houk Elementary School
 Iras Demo Elementary School
 Kuttu Elementary School
 Lekinioch Elementary School
 Losap Elementary School
 Makur Elementary School
 Manaio Elementary School
 Mechitiw Elementary School
 Moch Elementary School
 Munien/Nechocho Elementary School
 Murilo Elementary School
 Mwan Elementary School
 Namoluk Elementary School
 Neauo Elementary School
 Neirenomw Elementary School
 Nema Elementary School
 Nomwin Elementary School
 Oneop Elementary School
 Onou Elementary School
 Penia & Peniesene Elementary School
 Piis Paneu Elementary School
 Piisemwar Elementary School
 Polowat Elementary School
 Romanum Elementary School
 Sapota Paata Elementary School
 Sapou Elementary School
 Sapuk Elementary School
 Satowan Elementary School
 Ta Elementary School
 Teruo Bokuku Elementary School
 Udot Elementary School
 Wichukuno Elementary School
 Wonip Elementary School

Other:
 Akoyikoyi School

See also
 Education in the Federated States of Micronesia

References

External links
 Chuuk State Department of Education
 
education in the Federated States of Micronesia
Chuuk State